The Women's Freestyle 76  kg competition of the Wrestling events at the 2019 Pan American Games in Lima was held on August 9 at the Miguel Grau Coliseum.

Results
All times are local (UTC−5)
Legend
F — Won by fall

Final

Repechage

References

External links
Competition Sheet

Wrestling at the 2019 Pan American Games
2019 in women's sport wrestling